The Descent of Mary (Γεννα Μαριας or "Genna Marias") is a minor work of the New Testament apocrypha which is only known through mention in the Panarion of Epiphanius of Salamis, who gives a short passage. Epiphanius attributes the tale to the Gnostics.

The excerpt purports to be the story about the death of Zechariah, the father of John the Baptist, who is supposed to have seen a vision of a man "in the form of an ass" while burning incense in the temple. When he emerges, he is unable to speak at first, but when he is able to relate the vision, those about him kill him. The story is consonant with other Gnostic writings and depiction of Gnostic thought in the writings of Origen, as well as with  the Gospel of James; but there is no other testimony to this particular tale.

Scholars have suggested a 2nd-century date to the text.

References

New Testament apocrypha
Gnostic apocrypha